"I Got Soul" is a 2009 charity single by charity group War Child UK, recorded by Young Soul Rebels. It was released on 19 October 2009. It is a cover of The Killers' "All These Things That I've Done".  A spokesman for War Child UK said, "We're using the track, based on the hook line 'I Got Soul, But I’m Not A Soldier' to draw attention to the 300,000 children who sadly are."

Music video
The music video is set in the studio where the song was recorded.  It mainly features the Young Soul Rebels singing but also has clips of children in poverty, symbolizing what War Child charity is for.  The cover art for the single also flashes up occasionally, as does the War Child logo.

Young Soul Rebels

The Young Soul Rebels is the collective name of the artists who took part in the song:
 V V Brown
 Pixie Lott
 Tinchy Stryder
 N-Dubz
 Frankmusik
 Kid British
 Chipmunk
 MPHO
 Ironik
 Bashy
 London Community Gospel Choir
 McLean
 Ayak Thiik
 Egypt
 Domino Go
 Matt Hazell
 James Lough

Charts

Year-end charts

References

2009 singles
Charity singles
All-star recordings
N-Dubz songs
Chipmunk (rapper) songs